Dr. Rajendra Prasad Government Medical College (DRPGMC) is a government medical college and hospital located in district Kangra of Himachal Pradesh.

History

The hospital's history dates back to 28 October 1952 when Mr.Chandulal Trivedi,the Governor of Punjab,on behalf of Rai Bahadur Jodhamal Kuthiala,a philanthropist,laid the foundation stone of a TB sanatorium. The TB sanatorium was inaugurated by Dr.Rajendra Prasad,the first President of India,on 21 May 1958. The 200 bed hospital was the gift by Rai Bahadur to the Kangra residents. The foundation stone for the hospital was laid by the then Chief Minister Sh. Virbhadra Singh on 23 October 1996. The TB sanatorium was converted to the Medical College on 25 February 1997 with a hospital facility at Dharmasala. The new hospital was dedicated to public by the Chief Minister on 3 October 2008. The college was recognised by Medical Council of India(MCI) provisionally on 24 February 2005 and received permanent recognition in January 2010.

References

Medical colleges in Himachal Pradesh
Memorials to Rajendra Prasad
Education in Kangra district
Educational institutions established in 1996
1996 establishments in Himachal Pradesh